Saurabh Bhanwala (born 18 December 1999) is an Indian professional footballer who plays as a defender for ARA in the I-League 2.

Career
Saurabh Bhanwala as a child started playing in New Delhi and playing U-14 nationals representing Delhi state  held at Kalyani in 2012. Bhanwala is a product of Minerva Punjab youth system where he had an outstanding season in U-18 I-league which was held at Shillong, Bhanwala stayed with minerva next season where he was part of their senior team in I-League. After Bhanwala went on loan to CFL (Calcutta Football League) to Calcutta Custom, after it bhanwala returned to minerva playing for Punjab II where he played 2nd div i-league, after Bhanwala joined senior I-League team Roundglass Punjab FC, Saurabh Bhanwala made his first professional appearance in senior I-League for RoundGlass Punjab on 9 January 2021 against Aizawl FC. He played several games for roundglass in 2020-21 season and also won the title for "Defensive action of the season " award.

Career statistics

Club

Honours
Rajasthan United
Baji Rout Cup: 2022

References

1999 births
Living people
Footballers from Delhi
Indian footballers
Association football central defenders
I-League players
RoundGlass Punjab FC players
Rajasthan United FC players